A total solar eclipse will occur on September 14, 2099. A solar eclipse occurs when the Moon passes between Earth and the Sun, thereby totally or partly obscuring the image of the Sun for a viewer on Earth. A total solar eclipse occurs when the Moon's apparent diameter is larger than the Sun's, blocking all direct sunlight, turning day into darkness. Totality occurs in a narrow path across Earth's surface, with the partial solar eclipse visible over a surrounding region thousands of kilometres wide.

Locations experiencing totality 

It will begin at sunrise off the western coast of Canada, and move eastern across Canada (British Columbia, Alberta, and Saskatchewan) and the northern states of the United States (North Dakota, Minnesota, Wisconsin, Illinois, Indiana, Michigan, Ohio, West Virginia, Virginia and North Carolina). The eclipse will end in the Atlantic ocean, with partial visibility in parts of Europe, West Africa and throughout the entirety of North and South America.

The path of totality will pass through the cities of Madison, Wisconsin, and Grand Rapids, Michigan. The last time totality was visible over these two locations was respectively May 16, 1379, and April 18, 1558.

British Columbia 
 Williams Lake

Alberta 
 Calgary
 Medicine Hat

Saskatchewan 
 Swift Current

Montana 
 Plentywood

North Dakota 
 Williston
 Minot
 Fargo
 Grand Forks

Minnesota 
 Saint Cloud
 Minneapolis
 Saint Paul

Wisconsin 
 Eau Claire
 Wausau
 La Crosse
 Oshkosh
 Sheboygan
 Madison
 Janesville
 Milwaukee
 Kenosha

Illinois 
 Chicago
 Waukegan
 Evanston

Michigan 
 Grand Rapids
 Lansing
 Kalamazoo
 Ann Arbor

Indiana 
 South Bend
 Fort Wayne

Ohio 
 Toledo
 Lima
 Sandusky
 Mansfield
 Columbus
 Canton
 Zanesville

West Virginia 
 Parkersburg
 Wheeling
 Clarksburg
 Morgantown

Virginia 
 Staunton
 Harrisonburg
 Charlottesville
 Lynchburg
 Richmond
 Newport News
 Norfolk
 Virginia Beach

North Carolina 
 Kill Devil Hills
 Kitty Hawk

Although this solar eclipse does pass over a few large cities such as Minneapolis and Virginia Beach, it fails to offer totality in several major cities nearby, including most of Chicago and all of Washington D.C., Detroit, Cincinnati and Cleveland. Moreover, in Canada, the cities of Moose Jaw and Regina will be directly north of the path, but not in it.

Related eclipses

Solar eclipses 2098–2100

Saros 136

Inex series

Tritos series

Notes

References

 HermitEclipse: USA Eclipse Bonanza

2099 09 14
2099 in science
2099 09 14
2099 09 14